Peron Peninsula is a long narrow peninsula located in the Shark Bay World Heritage site in Western Australia, at about 25°51' S longitude and 113°30' E latitude. It is the largest of the Shark Bay peninsulas. Significant settlements include Denham and Monkey Mia. An airport (Shark Bay Airport) is located there.
It is the location of former Pastoral leases Peron and Nanga stations.
It is the main location of land access to points within the World Heritage site.  The northern area contains the Francois Peron National Park.  It is surrounded by the Shark Bay Marine Park and its lower southeast part is adjacent to the Hamelin Pool Marine Nature Reserve.

The Taillefer Isthmus, the narrowest section of the peninsula, is between Nanga and Goulet Bluff - which has Shell Beach located on the eastern side which lies in the L'Haridon Bight.

The northernmost point is Cape Peron which has a namesake further south in the metropolitan Perth coastal area.

History
The peninsula is named for French naturalist François Péron, who visited the area with the
Geographe expeditions of 1801 and 1803.  The peninsula was used as a sheep station from the late 1880s until being purchased by the national government in 1990. In 1919 Peron Peninsula Station had a total area of  divided into 25 paddocks and was stocked with 12,000 sheep.

Peron Homestead Artesian Bore
The Peron Historical Homestead is near Denham.  It includes a visitor center.  Peron Peninsula is part of the Carnarvon Basin, a geological structure lacking permanent fresh surface water. During the 1900s artesian bores were sunk to provide a greater quantity and quality of water.  The resulting water comes up hot (35-60 °C) and has high salt and mineral content.

References

Further reading
(1830) Account of Peron's Peninsula, in Shark's Bay, Western Australia : with remarks on its capabilities and fitness to receive a small fishing settlement : compiled from various sources by a gentleman in the service of the Hon. East India Company. From the Edinburgh Journal of Natural and Geographical Science, Vol. II, 1830, pp. 249–257.
(available as a photocopy at Battye Library) 
 Thomson, Carolyn (1997) Discovering Shark Bay Marine Park and Monkey Mia Como, W.A. Department of Conservation and Land Management.  page 52 for aspects of Cape Peron

Peninsulas of Western Australia
Shark Bay